The 1967 Atlanta Falcons season was the franchise's second year in the National Football League (NFL). Unable to improve on their 3-11, second-to-last place finish from their inaugural season, the Falcons finished with the worst record in the whole NFL, at 1-12-1. They failed to qualify for the playoffs for the second consecutive season.

The Falcons were shifted from the Eastern Conference to the Western with the addition of the New Orleans Saints for 1967. Atlanta was farther east than three Eastern Conference teams: the Saints, Dallas Cowboys, and St. Louis Cardinals.

Offseason

NFL Draft

Personnel

Staff

Roster

Regular season

Schedule 

Note: Intra-division opponents are in bold text.

Game summaries

Week 14

Standings

References

External links 
 1967 Atlanta Falcons at Pro-Football-Reference.com

Atlanta Falcons
Atlanta Falcons seasons
Atlanta